Göteborg Hockey Club, abbreviated as Göteborg HC or GHC, are an ice hockey club in Angered, a borough of Gothenburg in southwestern Sweden. They played in the Swedish Women's Hockey League (SDHL), the top Swedish women's hockey league, during 2017 to November 2022. In early November 2022, the club withdrew from the SDHL.

History   
Göteborg HC was founded in 2014 and its representative team earned promotion to the SDHL in 2017. The team finished the regular season in last place during each of the five seasons they completed in the SDHL but they managed to avoid relegation each time.

The club earned its first win in the SDHL in November 2017, with a 4–2 victory over SDE Hockey.

In October 2020, goaltender Frida Axell became the first Göteborg HC player to earn a call-up to the senior Swedish national team.

In the community  
In addition to the senior representative team, Göteborg HC operates a free youth hockey school at Angered Arena on Sundays, offering all-girls and coed classes. Frölunda Hockey Club of the Swedish Hockey League has donated funds to GHC to help support, as Frölunda's Academy and Development Manager Mikael Ström described, “the important work GHC is doing in Angered.” Regarding Göteborg HC's hockey school and its partnership with Frölunda HC, GHC president Jan Mellgren said, “We think it is important to build hockey in multicultural areas and we have a good collaboration with Frölunda in that work.”

Season-by-season results 
This list includes all seasons completed by Göteborg HC since gaining promotion to the SDHL.

Code explanation: Finish = Rank at end of regular season; GP = Games played, W = Wins (3 points), OTW = Overtime wins (2 points), OTL = Overtime losses (1 point), L = Losses, GF = Goals for, GA = Goals against, Pts = Points, Top scorer: Points (Goals+Assists)

Players and personnel

2022–23 roster 

Coaching staff and team personnel
 Head coach: Snorri Sigurbergsson
 Assistant coach: Henry Vilhelmsson
 Assistant coach: Johan Vilhelmsson
 Goaltending coach: Dennis Hedstrom
 Mental coach: Barbro Sundberg
 Medical team: Ida Leipe & Gert Norell
 Equipment manager: Christoffer Gustafsson

Team captaincy history 
 Anna Borgfeldt, 2017–2020
 Margot Möllersten, 2020–2022
 Alexa McMillan, 2022

Head coaches 
 Jan Mellgren, 2014–2016
 Heini Lundin, 2017–18
 Oscar Annell, 2018–2020
 Stefanie McKeough, 2020 – 13 October 2020
 Heini Lundin, 14 October 2020 – 11 January 2022
 Henry Vilhelmsson, 14 January 2022 – 22 April 2022
 Snorri Sigurbergsson, 22 April 2022 – 4 November 2022

References

External links 
  

Ice hockey clubs established in 2014
Ice hockey teams in Sweden
Ice hockey teams in Västra Götaland County
Sport in Gothenburg
Swedish Women's Hockey League teams
Women's ice hockey teams in Europe